World records in disability athletics are ratified by the International Paralympic Committee (IPC). In Paralympic athletics competitions, athletes are given a class depending on the type and extent of their disability. The classes are as follows:
 11–13: Blind and visually impaired
 20: Intellectually disabled
 32–38: Athletes with cerebral palsy; classes 32–34 compete in wheelchairs, while 35–38 are ambulant
 40–46: Ambulant athletes with amputations or other disabilities such as dwarfism
 51–58: Wheelchair athletes with spinal cord injuries or amputations
The IPC recognizes records for each of these classes.

Key:

Outdoor

Men

100 m

200 m

Notes:

400 m

800 m

1500 m

3000 m

5000 m

10000 m

110 m hurdles

400 m hurdles

4 × 100 m relay

4 × 400 m relay

High jump

Long jump

Triple jump

Club throw

Shot put

Notes:

Discus throw

Javelin throw

Pentathlon

Women

100 m

200 m

400 m

800 m

1500 m

3000 m

5000 m

10000 m

100 m hurdles

400 m hurdles

4 × 100 m relay

4 × 400 m relay

High jump

Long jump

Triple jump

Club throw

Shot put

Discus throw

Javelin throw

Pentathlon

Road

Men

Half marathon

Marathon

Women

Half marathon

Marathon

See also 

 List of IPC world records in swimming

Notes and references

Notes

References
General
IPC Athletics Outdoor World records
IPC Athletics Road World records.
Specific

IPC
IPC